BNS Sangu  is an  offshore patrol vessel of the Bangladesh Navy. She began serving the Bangladesh Navy in 2004.

History
Built by Hall, Russell & Company, she was modelled on the ocean-going trawlers FPV Jura (1973) and FPV Westra (1974). She was launched on 17 February 1977. She was commissioned into the Royal Navy as HMS Guernsey (P297) on 28 October 1977. On 29 January 2004 she was sold to the Bangladesh Navy.

Career
BNS Sangu reached Mongla Naval Base in May 2004 after an 8,000 mile journey from the United Kingdom. The ship made brief stopovers at Tangier port, Morocco, Port Said, Egypt, Jeddah, Saudi Arabia, the Port of Salalah, Oman and the Port of Colombo in Sri Lanka as goodwill visits as well as to replenish rations, fuel and provisions. The ship was commissioned on 3 October 2004 under the command of the Commodore Commanding Khulna (COMKHUL), but was later commanded by Commodore Commanding BN Flotilla (COMBAN). About 100 personnel serve on board her.

BNS Sangu participated in the CARAT exercise with the US Navy in the Bay of Bengal in September 2011. The ship also participated in CARAT 2012 a year later.

BNS Sangu participated in Exercise Milan, a biennial multilateral exercise at Andaman Islands in India in 2008 and 2014.

Gallery

See also
List of active ships of the Bangladesh Navy

References

Bibliography

External links
Image as HMS Guernsey

Ships of the Bangladesh Navy
Patrol vessels of the Bangladesh Navy
Island-class patrol vessels of the Bangladesh Navy
1977 ships
Ships of the Fishery Protection Squadron of the United Kingdom
Ships built by Hall, Russell & Company